The 2016 African Men's Handball Championship was the 22nd edition of the African Men's Handball Championship and held in Egypt from 21 to 30 January 2016. It acted as the African qualifying tournament for the 2016 Summer Olympics and the 2017 World Men's Handball Championship.

Egypt won their sixth title after defeating Tunisia 21–19, while Angola defeated Algeria 25–19 to capture the bronze medal.

The win qualified Egypt for the Olympics, while runner-up Tunisia received a place in the Olympic Qualification Tournament.

Venue

Qualified teams

1 Bold indicates champion for that year. Italics indicates host.

Referees
7 couples were announced for the competition.

Squads

Preliminary round
The draw was held on 23 October 2015.

All times are local (UTC+2).

Group A

Group B

Knockout stage

5th place bracket

9th place bracket

Quarterfinals

9–12th place semifinals

5–8th place semifinals

Semifinals

Eleventh place game

Ninth place game

Seventh place game

Fifth place game

Third place game

Final

Final ranking

References

External links
Results at todor66
Official website

2016 Men
African Men's Handball Championship
2016 African Men's Handball Championship
African Men's Handball Championship
African Men's Handball Championship
African Men's Handball Championship